Christophe Gamel (born 11 August 1972) is a French football coach who is currently head coach of Malaysia Super League club Sri Pahang FC.

Coaching career
Gamel played semi-professionally for various French and Italian clubs while coaching youth football teams. He has a pro licence from the Union of European Football Associations (UEFA). He has also worked with Al Rayyan SC in Qatar and Diósgyőri VTK in Hungary before taking on the job of the assistant coach of the Paris Saint-Germain women's team.

Fiji
On 31 December 2016, it was reported that Gamel would take over as the Fiji national team's new head coach, replacing the sacked Frank Farina.  
Gamel says “I have my own methodology of work which has brought success to my teams in the past and I hope I can achieve the same with Fiji. My task is to build for the future and we will need everyone to be involved. We respect our opponents and we know that they are strong. Solidarity, sacrifices, hard work and our pleasure to play will be our weapons. First we build a new style of play and culture in all the national teams, then we develop coaches’ formations, develop a database for national players, improve international visibility of Fiji football, and develop the women’s game in Fiji.”

On August 2019, Gamel announced his retirement from being the head coach of the Fiji national football team, citing personal reasons. He would finish his role on 30 August 2019.

Sri Pahang

Gamel was appointed as Sri Pahang FC's assistant head coach for the 2021 season, assisting Thomas Dooley. However, after Dooley was replaced by Dollah Salleh, Gamel was appointed as manager for Sri Pahang FC's Presidential Cup Team (youth team).

On 4th of January 2022, Sri Pahang FC officially announced its naming of Gamel as head coach, replacing Dollah Salleh who became Sri Pahang's manager.

Managerial statistics

References

External links
Christophe Gamel at JB Sport Consulting 
Christophe Gamel - Staff Sheet - First Team  at Paris Saint-Germain

1972 births
Living people
People from Meaux
Association football coaches
French football managers
Expatriate football managers in Fiji
Fiji national football team managers
K.S.V. Roeselare managers
Association footballers not categorized by position
Sportspeople from Seine-et-Marne